Cytospin-B is a protein that, in humans, is encoded by the CYTSB gene.

References

Further reading